Jonatan Nielsen (born September 11, 1993) is a Swedish professional ice hockey player. He currently plays for Rødovre Mighty Bulls of Metal Ligaen, the top tier league in Denmark. Nielsen was selected 194th overall in the 2012 NHL Entry Draft by the Florida Panthers.

Career statistics

Regular season and playoffs

International

References

External links

1993 births
Florida Panthers draft picks
Living people
People from Gislaved Municipality
Linköping HC players
Rødovre Mighty Bulls players
Södertälje SK players
Swedish ice hockey defencemen
IF Troja/Ljungby players
Sportspeople from Jönköping County